The Żabbar Batteries and Redoubt were a series of artillery batteries and a redoubt in Żabbar, Malta, built by Maltese insurgents during the French blockade of 1798–1800. They formed part of a chain of batteries, redoubts and entrenchments encircling the French positions in Marsamxett and the Grand Harbour.

Description and history
Żabbar was the closest Maltese city to the French-occupied harbour fortifications, and it was repeatedly bombarded from the Cottonera Lines. The inhabitants barricaded the streets and built batteries and a redoubt to protect the city from an attack. The fortifications of Żabbar consisted of:
a battery near the parish church, which was armed with two cannons
a battery blocking the road to the Notre Dame Gate
a battery and a redoubt blocking the southwest flank of the village. The redoubt was of the pietra a secco type, similar to one found at Saint Agatha's Tower.
The batteries were fitted with underground shelters or were covered over to protect the gun crews. They fell under the command of Clemente Ellul, and his deputies Giuseppe Cachia and Giuseppe Ellul.

Like the other French blockade fortifications, the Żabbar Batteries and Redoubt were probably demolished soon after the end of the blockade. No traces of the actual batteries or redoubt can be seen today, but some buildings which had been incorporated into the redoubt, including a windmill, still exist.

References

Batteries in Malta
Redoubts in Malta
Żabbar
Military installations established in 1798
Demolished buildings and structures in Malta
French occupation of Malta
Vernacular architecture in Malta
Limestone buildings in Malta
1798 establishments in Malta
18th-century fortifications
18th Century military history of Malta